The 1947 Clark Panthers football team was an American football team that represented Clark College in the Southern Intercollegiate Athletic Conference (SIAC) during the 1947 college football season. In its first year under head coach Marion M. Curry, the team compiled a 4–3–1 record, 3–2–1 against conference opponents. The team was ranked No. 21 among the nation's black college football teams according to the Pittsburgh Courier and its Dickinson Rating System. 

End Grady Williams was the team captain. Other key players included quarterback George Gray and halfbacks Schley Williamson and Johnny Richards. Albert Watts and Dean Charlton Hamilton were assistant coaches.

Schedule

References

Clark
Clark Atlanta Panthers football seasons
Clark football